Léonard Décade Tousez (1788–1826) was a French actor and playwright of the 19th century.

Biography 
Tousez was born in Paris. An actor at the Théâtre des Variétés (1816-1826), he played the handsome young men in Les Bolivars et les Morillos ou Les amours de Belleville (1819) by Armand d'Artois and Gabriel de Lurieu as well as, inter alia, in Le témoin ou La Porte-Maillot (1820) by Eugène Scribe, Mélesville and Xavier Boniface.

In 1818, he married Charlotte Zoë Régnier de la Brière, an actress and François-Joseph Regnier's mother.

He took part in the composition of several plays of the boulevard theatre genre which were presented at the Théâtre du Gymnase dramatique and the Théâtre du Vaudeville.

He lost reason while performing in 1826 and died in the asylum at Charenton.

Works 
1820: Les bons gendarmes, poème épique en deux chants, with Charles Odry
1823: L'atelier de peinture, tableau-vaudeville in 1 act, with Sewrin
1823: Le Chevalier d'honneur, comedy in 1 act, mingled with vaudevilles, with Sewrin and Nicolas Gersin
1823: Le Lithographe, ou les Scènes populaires, vaudeville in 1 act, with Sewrin
1825: Le Point d'honneur, vaudeville in 1 act, with Benjamin Antier

Bibliography 
 François-Antoine Harel, Dictionnaire théâtral ou, douze cent trente-trois vérités..., 1824, 
 Maurice Alhoy, Grande biographie dramatique, ou Silhouette des acteurs..., 1824,  (Read on line)
 Henry Lyonnet, Dictionnaire des comédiens français, 1911,

References 

19th-century French male actors
French male stage actors
19th-century French dramatists and playwrights
Male actors from Paris
1788 births
1826 deaths
Deaths from dementia in France